Zu Chongzhi (429–500 AD), courtesy name Wenyuan, was a Chinese astronomer, mathematician, politician, inventor, and writer during the Liu Song and Southern Qi dynasties. He was most notable for calculating pi as between 3.1415926 and 3.1415927, a record in accuracy which would not be surpassed for over 800 years.

Life and works

Chongzhi's ancestry was from modern Baoding, Hebei. To flee from the ravages of war, Zu's grandfather Zu Chang moved to the Yangtze, as part of the massive population movement during the Eastern Jin. Zu Chang at one point held the position of Chief Minister for the Palace Buildings within the Liu Song and was in charge of government construction projects. Zu's father, Zu Shuozhi, also served the court and was greatly respected for his erudition.

Zu was born in Jiankang. His family had historically been involved in astronomical research, and from childhood Zu was exposed to both astronomy and mathematics. When he was only a youth his talent earned him much repute.  When Emperor Xiaowu of Liu Song heard of him, he was sent to the Hualin Xuesheng academy, and later the Imperial Nanjing University (Zongmingguan) to perform research. In 461 in Nanxu (today Zhenjiang, Jiangsu), he was engaged in work at the office of the local governor.

Zu Chongzhi, along with his son Zu Gengzhi, wrote a mathematical text entitled Zhui Shu ("Methods for Interpolation").  It is said that the treatise contained formulas for the volume of a sphere, cubic equations and an accurate value of pi. This book has been lost since the Song Dynasty.

His mathematical achievements included
the Daming calendar introduced by him in 465.
distinguishing the sidereal year and the tropical year. He measured 45 years and 11 months per degree between those two; today we know the difference is 70.7 years per degree.
calculating one year as 365.24281481 days, which is very close to 365.24219878 days as we know today.
calculating the number of overlaps between sun and moon as 27.21223, which is very close to 27.21222 as we know today; using this number he successfully predicted an eclipse four times during 23 years (from 436 to 459).
calculating the Jupiter year as about 11.858 Earth years, which is very close to 11.862 as we know of today.
He obtained the result by approximating a circle with a 24,576 (= 213 × 3) sided polygon. This was an impressive feat for the time, especially considering that the counting rods he used for recording intermediate results were merely a pile of wooden sticks laid out in certain patterns. Japanese mathematician Yoshio Mikami pointed out, " was nothing more than the  value obtained several hundred years earlier by the Greek mathematician Archimedes, however milü  =  could not be found in any Greek, Indian or Arabian manuscripts, not until 1585 Dutch mathematician Adriaan Anthoniszoon obtained this fraction; the Chinese possessed this most extraordinary fraction over a whole millennium earlier than Europe". Hence Mikami strongly urged that the fraction  be named after Zu Chongzhi as Zu's fraction. In Chinese literature, this fraction is known as "Zu's ratio".
finding the volume of a sphere as D3/6 where D is diameter (equivalent to 4r3/3).

Astronomy 
Zu was an accomplished astronomer who calculated the time values with unprecedented precision. His methods of interpolation and the use of integration were far ahead of his time. Even the results of the astronomer Yi Xing (who was beginning to utilize foreign knowledge) were not comparable. The Sung dynasty calendar was backwards to the "Northern barbarians" because they were implementing their daily lives with the Da Ming Li. It is said that his methods of calculation were so advanced, the scholars of the Sung dynasty and Indo influence astronomers of the Tang dynasty found it confusing.

Mathematics 

The majority of Zu's great mathematical works are recorded in his lost text the Zhui Shu. Most schools argue about his complexity since traditionally the Chinese had developed mathematics as algebraic and equational. Logically, scholars assume that the Zhui Shu yields methods of cubic equations. His works on the accurate value of pi describe the lengthy calculations involved. Zu used the Liu Hui's  algorithm described earlier by Liu Hui to inscribe a 12,288-gon. Zu's value of pi is precise to six decimal places and for a thousand years thereafter no subsequent mathematician computed a value this precise. Zu also worked on deducing the formula for the volume of a sphere.

Inventions and innovations

Hammer mills
In 488, Zu Chongzhi was responsible for erecting water powered trip hammer mills which was inspected by Emperor Wu of Southern Qi during the early 490s.

Paddle boats
Zu is also credited with inventing Chinese paddle boats or Qianli chuan in the late 5th century AD during the Southern Qi Dynasty. The boats made sailing a more reliable form of transportation and based on the shipbuilding technology of its day, numerous paddle wheel ships were constructed during the Tang era as the boats were able to cruise at faster speeds than the existing vessels at the time as well as being able to cover hundreds of kilometers of distance without the aid of wind.

South pointing chariot
The south-pointing chariot device was first invented by the Chinese mechanical engineer Ma Jun (c. 200–265 AD). It was a wheeled vehicle that incorporated an early use of differential gears to operate a fixed figurine that would constantly point south, hence enabling one to accurately measure their directional bearings. This effect was achieved not by magnetics (like in a compass), but through intricate mechanics, the same design that allows equal amounts of torque applied to wheels rotating at different speeds for the modern automobile. After the Three Kingdoms period, the device fell out of use temporarily. However, it was Zu Chongzhi who successfully re-invented it in 478, as described in the texts of the Book of Song and the Book of Qi, with a passage from the latter below:

When Emperor Wu of Liu Song subdued Guanzhong he obtained the south-pointing carriage of Yao Xing, but it was only the shell with no machinery inside. Whenever it moved it had to have a man inside to turn (the figure). In the Sheng-Ming reign period, Gao Di commissioned Zi Zu Chongzhi to reconstruct it according to the ancient rules. He accordingly made new machinery of bronze, which would turn round about without a hitch and indicate the direction with uniformity. Since Ma Jun's time such a thing had not been.Book of Qi, 52.905

Literature 
Zu's paradoxographical work Accounts of Strange Things [] survives.

Named after him
  ≈  as Zu Chongzhi's  ratio.
The lunar crater Tsu Chung-Chi
1888 Zu Chong-Zhi is the name of asteroid 1964 VO1.
ZUC stream cipher is a new encryption algorithm.

Notes

References
Needham, Joseph (1986). Science and Civilization in China: Volume 4, Part 2. Cambridge University Press
Du Shiran and He Shaogeng, "Zu Chongzhi". Encyclopedia of China (Mathematics Edition), 1st ed.

Further reading

External links
Encyclopædia Britannica's description of Zu Chongzhi
Zu Chongzhi at Chinaculture.org
Zu Chongzhi at the University of Maine 

429 births
500 deaths
5th-century Chinese mathematicians
5th-century Chinese astronomers
Ancient Chinese mathematicians
Chinese inventors
Liu Song dynasty people
Liu Song politicians
Liu Song writers
Pi-related people
Politicians from Nanjing
Scientists from Nanjing
Southern Qi politicians
Writers from Nanjing